Zabdin (also spelled Zabadayn) is a village in southern Syria, administratively part of the Markaz Rif Dimashq District of the Rif Dimashq Governorate, located just east of Damascus. Nearby localities include al-Malihah to the west, Shabaa to the south, Deir al-Asafir to the southeast, Harasta al-Qantarah and Marj al-Sultan to the east, Beit Nayim to the northeast and Jisrin and Saqba to the northwest. According to the Syria Central Bureau of Statistics (CBS), Zabdin had a population of 7,003 in the 2004 census.

References

Populated places in Markaz Rif Dimashq District